Following is a list of railway stations in Bolivia, categorized by eastern and western networks.  The eastern and western networks do not directly connect, except via a roundabout route through Argentina.

Many lines originally were 762mm gauge; some, but not all, have been converted to 1000mm gauge.

Maps 
 UN Map

Towns served by rail

West 

 Guaqui (3822m) - branch terminus and inland port
 Viacha - junction
 La Paz (3640m) - terminus and national administrative capital
 Oruro, Bolivia (3710m) - junction
 Cochabamba (2574m) - terminus
 Potosí - branch
 Sucre (2750m) - branch terminus and national constitutional capital
 Uyuni (3670m) - junction for line to Chile
 Tupiza
 Villazón - border with Argentina

 Arque

Open or Closed? 
 Uncia - branch terminus - mine

East 

 Trinidad (130m) - terminus
 Loreto
 Santa Rosa del Sara
 Montero (292m)
 Santa Cruz - junction for Trinidad and Puerto Suárez
 Villamontes (439m)
 Yacuiba- border with Argentina
 San José de Chiquitos (304m)
 Roboré
 Santa Ana de Velasco
  Puerto Suárez (117m) - border with Brazil
  Corumbá

Proposed 
 Sucre (W)
 (missing link) 
 Santa Cruz (E)

 2013, September, design consultancy for Montero-Bulo Bulo railway 
 2010, October, Peru and Bolivia agreed to transfer land from Peru to Bolivia to provide Bolivia with access to the sea, to replace the lands stolen & lost in the War of the Pacific with Chile.
  Ilo, Peru (15m) port to be leased to Bolivia
  Puerto Suárez

See also 

 Transport in Bolivia
 Bolivia
 Railway stations in Peru - transAndean Railway

References 

 
Railway stations
Railway stations